The Painter's Palette is the second album by Italian avant-garde metal / jazz band Ephel Duath.

Track listing

 "The Passage (Pearl Grey)" - 4:11
 "The Unpoetic Circle (Bottle Green)" - 4:54
 "Labyrinthine (Crimson)" - 5:21
 "Praha (Ancient Gold)" - 5:17
 "The Picture (Bordeaux)" - 4:52
 "Ruins (Deep Blue and Violet)" - 4:56
 "Ironical Communion (Amber)" - 5:28
 "My Glassy Shelter (Dirty White)" - 4:46
 "The Other's Touch (Amaranth)" - 6:44

Personnel

Performers
Ephel Duath – arranger, sampling
Davide Tolomei – vocals
Luciano Lorusso George – screams
Davide Tiso – guitar
Fabio Fecchio – bass
Davide Piovesan – drums
Maurizio Scomparin – trumpet

Production
Paso – arranger, synthesizer, noise, structures, producer
Gabriele Ravaglia – assistant
Gianni Gamberini – assistant
Federico Tanzi – assistant
Twan Sibon – CD-ROM design
Matteo Pizzimenti – photography

References

2003 albums
Ephel Duath (band) albums
Earache Records albums